Brand Babu  is a 2018 Indian Telugu language film directed by Prabhakar Podakandla. It stars Sumanth Shailendra and Eesha Rebba.

Cast

Sumanth Shailendra as Diamond Babu 
Eesha Rebba as Radha
Murali Sharma as Diamond Babu's father
Raja Ravindra as Radha's uncle
Pujita Ponnada as Pavani
Satyam Rajesh
Nalini
Venu as Diamond Babu's assistant
Meesam Suresh

Soundtrack

Reviews

The Times of India gave 3 out of 5 stars, praised the climax of the film, and concluded, "Audiences need to watch the movie to know how the twisted love story ends and whether the brand obsessed father- son accept Radha for who she is". Indiaglitz gave 2.25 stars, stating, "An attempt to narrate a rich boy-meets-poor girl story goes haywire, thanks to a lame comedy of errors and a bloodless class war, Maruthi-style."

References

External links 
 

2010s Telugu-language films
2018 masala films